KLNM-LD, virtual channel 42 (UHF digital channel 32), is a low-powered television station licensed to Lufkin, Texas, United States. Broadcasting in 2021 with Westerns 4u, and reaching out in one month to over 1.65 million viewers. The station is owned by Miller Media. 

On June 12, 2009, the digital TV conversion period for full-service stations ended. KLNM-LP was not affected by this mandate since it is a low-power station; however, the FCC listed a construction permit for a low-power digital signal.

In March 2010, KLNM began broadcasting a digital format on its America One network feed and TBN Enlace feed.

In April 2011, KLNM began broadcasting on SuddenLink Communications on Channel 16 in Lufkin and Nacogdoches, offering local programming and a national feed.

On February 1, 2015, KLNM entered into a contractual agreement with Dash Media providing 24/7 affiliate feed to The Lufkin, Nacogdoches area via KLNM 42.2. In an effort to increase viewers to its primetime format, 42.1 will also run movies and primetime feed from Dash Media along with its local content and locally produced shows.

February 2023 Miller Media entered into annual agreements with Get After it TV, formerly Luken Communications with affiliate channels , Revn, Family Channel, and Retro Tv.

Channel assignment 
Ch.1 is Westerns 4u, a classic westerns movie channel

Digital channels
The station's digital signal is multiplexed:

References

External links
 

Television stations in Texas
Low-power television stations in the United States
Television channels and stations established in 1996
1996 establishments in Texas